The Gorse Trilogy is a series of three novels, the last published works of the author Patrick Hamilton. The stories follow the anti-hero Ernest Ralph Gorse, whose heartlessness and lack of scruple are matched only by the inventiveness and panache with which he swindles his victims. He is thought to have been based on the real-life con-man and murderer Neville George Heath, executed in 1946.

Gorse insinuates himself into the lives of his victims with his good looks and easy confidence, and always with a good story. His victims are women, and he flatters his way into their affections until he is in a position to turn things to his advantage. Graham Greene called The West Pier "the best book written about Brighton", while L.P. Hartley said, "The entertainment value of this brilliantly told story could hardly be higher." Writing for The Independent, critic D. J. Taylor called Unknown Assailant "an inferior work" while The Guardian called it "drink-soaked."

An adaptation of Mr Stimpson and Mr Gorse was produced by ITV in 1987 (called The Charmer and starring Nigel Havers).

 The West Pier (1952)
 Mr. Stimpson and Mr. Gorse (1953)
 Unknown Assailant (1955)

Gorse also appears as a secondary villain in the novel Johnny Alucard by Kim Newman.

Further reading
 Jones, Nigel (1991) Through a Glass Darkly: The Life of Patrick Hamilton, Scribners
 French, Sean (1993) Patrick Hamilton: A Life, Faber and Faber
 Hamilton, Patrick (2007) The Gorse Trilogy, Black Spring Press.

References

English novels
1952 British novels
1953 British novels
1955 British novels
Novel series
Novels set in Sussex
Novels set in Brighton
Works by Patrick Hamilton (writer)